Alegría is a Spanish surname native of the Basque Country, Spain. While some authors place the origin of this lineage in Navarre and Vitoria , most writers take as true that its origin comes from the natives of Alegría de Oria, district of Tolosa, in the province of Guipuzkoa.

Branches from the very old houses of the Basque Country and Navarre went to other places in Spain, as some of their knights went to Andalusia to serve the Catholic Monarchs in the conquest of Granada. Others went to Murcia and settled in the town of Totana. The surname then spread to Latin America mostly coming from Navarra.

Notable people with the surname include:
Alexander Alegría (born 1992), Spanish footballer
María Alegria Continente (born 1977), Spanish politician
Ciro Alegría (1909–1967), Peruvian journalist, novelist and politician
Michael López-Alegría, Spanish-American astronaut
Claribel Alegría (1924–2018), Nicaraguan writer
Miguel José de Azanza Alegría (1745-1826), Duke of Santa Fe and Viceroy of New Spain
Fernando Alegría (1918–2005), Chilean author, diplomat, and academic
Raymundo Polanco-Alegría, Dominican Air Force military and businessman 
Jannet Alegría (born 1987), Mexican taekwondo practitioner
Luis Alegría (born 1980), Chilean footballer
Mario Alegría, Peruvian politician
Pedro Alegría, Dominican Republic politician
Rosa Luz Alegría (born 1949), Mexican physicist
Sigrid Alegría (born 1974), Chilean actress

References

Spanish-language surnames